Doughty is an English and Scottish surname. Notable people with the surname include:

 Al Doughty (born 1966), British musician and bassist
 Andrew Doughty (1916–2013), British anaesthetist
 Anthony Doughty (born 1963), British musician
 Arthur Doughty (1860–1936), Canadian civil servant
 Brandon Doughty (born 1991), American football player
 C.N. Doughty (1867–1915), American artist (Joseph John Englehart)
 Caitlin Doughty (born 1984), American mortician and death-positivity advocate
 Cecil Langley Doughty (1913–1985), British comics artist and illustrator
 Charles Doughty (politician) (1902–1973), British Conservative Party politician
 Charles Montagu Doughty (1843–1926), English poet, writer, and traveller
 Charles Doughty-Wylie (1868–1915), British army officer, nephew of the above
 David Doughty (born 1937), English cricketer
 Drew Doughty (born 1989), Canadian professional ice hockey player
 Eugenia Doughty (1874–1934), second wife of Sir George Doughty
 Eva Craig Graves Doughty (1852–?), American journalist
 George Doughty (politician) (1854–1914), British ship-owner and politician
 Glenn Doughty (born 1951), American football player
 Henry Montagu Doughty (1870-1921), British naval officer
 Jack Doughty (1865–1937), Welsh footballer
 John Doughty (1754–1826), American militia general
 Kenny Doughty (born 1975), British actor
 Lewis Doughty (born 1990), English squash player
 Louise Doughty (born 1963), English novelist, playwright and journalist
 Matt Doughty (born 1981), English footballer
 Michael Doughty (Australian footballer) (born 1979), Australian rules footballer
 Mike Doughty (born 1970), American singer and songwriter
 Neal Doughty (born 1946), American keyboard player, founding member of REO Speedwagon
 Nigel Doughty (1957–2012), British investor, chairman of Doughty Hanson & Co
 Patrick K. Doughty, American sports announcer
 Phil Doughty (born 1986), English footballer
 Reed Doughty (born 1982), American football strong safety
 Roger Doughty (1868–1914), Welsh footballer
 Ross E. Doughty (1910–2000), Justice of the Supreme Court of Texas
 Sue Doughty (born 1948), British politician, MP for Guildford 2001–2005
 Thomas Doughty (artist) (1793–1856), American artist
 Thomas Doughty (explorer) (1545–1578), English nobleman, soldier, and scholar
 William Doughty (naval architect) (1773–1859), United States naval architect
 William Doughty (painter) (1757–1782), British painter

See also
 Doughty Street
 Dowty (disambiguation)